Michigan Left is the second full-length album by Arkells. It was announced on August 15, 2011 that the album would be released on October 18, 2011. The album cover and track list were also debuted on the band's website the same day. "Whistleblower", the first single, was premiered on July 30, 2011 and was released for purchase on iTunes July 5. The video for the song premiered on New.Music.Live. on MuchMusic July 21, 2011.

The album was nominated for Rock Album of the Year at the 2012 Juno Awards.

Track listing
All songs written by Arkells.

Personnel
Max Kerman  – vocals, guitar
Mike DeAngelis – vocals, guitar
Dan Griffin – vocals, keyboard, guitar, percussion, harmonica
Nick Dika – bass
Tim Oxford – drums, percussion
Kathleen Edwards – guest vocals on "Agent Zero"

References

2011 albums
Arkells albums
Universal Music Canada albums